Special Week (2 May 1995 – 27 April 2018) was a Japanese Thoroughbred racehorse and sire. Between 1997 and 1999 he won ten of his seventeen races including four at Grade I level. After winning his only start as a juvenile he emerged as a top-class performer in the following season: he won the Tokyo Yushun (Japanese Derby) and three other graded races as well as being placed in the Satsuki Sho, Kikuka Sho and the Japan Cup. He performed even better as a four-year-old in 1999 winning the Hanshin Daishoten, the spring and autumn editions of the Tenno Sho, and the Japan Cup. In the last-named race he defeated a strong international field including the winners of the Prix de l'Arc de Triomphe and The Derby.

He later became a successful breeding stallion siring the Japanese Horse of the Year Buena Vista.

Background
Special Week was a brown horse with a white blaze standing 16.1¾ hands high, bred in Japan by Hidaka Taiyo Bokujo. He was sired by Sunday Silence, who won the 1989 Kentucky Derby, before retiring to stud in Japan where he was champion sire on thirteen consecutive occasions. His other major winners included Deep Impact, Stay Gold, Heart's Cry, Zenno Rob Roy and Neo Universe. Special Week's dam Campaign Girl was an unraced daughter of Maruzensky and was a great-granddaughter of the leading Japanese broodmare Shiraoki, whose other descendants have included Vodka, Kodama (Satsuki Sho, Tokyo Yushun), Shin Tsubame (Satsuki Sho), Matikanefukukitaru (Kikuka Sho) and Sister Tosho (Oka Sho). Campaign Girl died shortly after foaling Special Week and the colt had to be hand-fed by stable staff.

During his racing career the colt was owned by Hiroyoshi Usuda, trained by Toshiaki Shirai and ridden in most of his races by Yutaka Take.

Racing career

1997: two-year-old season
On his only appearance as a two-year-old Special Week ran in a maiden race over 1600 metres at Hanshin Racecourse on 19 November. He made a successful debut, beating thirteen opponents headed by Legacy Hunter.

1998: three-year-old season
Special Week began his second season by finishing second to Asahi Creek in the Shiraume Sho over 1600 metres at Kyoto Racecourse in January. In the following month was moved up in class and distance for the Grade III Kisaragi Sho over 1800 metres at the same course and recorded his first major win, beating Bold Emperor and thirteen others. In March he was stepped up again for the Grade II Hochi Hai Yayoi Sho (the major trial race for the Satsuki Sho) over 2000 metres at Nakayama Racecourse and won from Seiun Sky and King Halo. In the Satsuki Sho over the same course and distance on 19 April he was unable to reproduce his earlier form and finished third, beaten half a length and a length by Seiun Sky and King Halo. On 7 June, Special Week was one of a field of eighteen colts, also including Seiun Sky and King Halo, to contest the Tokyo Yushun over 2400 metres at Tokyo Racecourse and was ridden as in most of his races by Yutaka Take. Special Week won by five lengths from Bold Emperor with Daiwa Superior taking third ahead of Seiun Sky.

After a four-month break, Special Week returned in October for the Grade II Kyoto Shimbun Hai over 2200 metres on 18 October and won from King Halo. On 8 November he faced King Halo, Bold Emperor, Seiun Sky and Daiwa Superior in the Grade I Kikuka Sho over 3000 metres at Kyoto Racecourse. He finished second of the eighteen runners behind Seiun Sky, who won in a course record time of 3:03.2. On his final start of the season Special Week was matched against older horses for the first time in the Japan Cup at Tokyo on 29 November. Ridden by Yukio Okabe he started the 2.3/1 favourite in a fifteen-runner field which included challengers from Germany, Canada, the United States and Britain. He was in sixth place entering the straight and made steady progress in the closing stages to finish third behind El Condor Pasa and Air Groove.

1999: four-year-old season
Special Week began his third season in the Grade II American Jockey Club Stakes at Nakayama on 24 January and won from Silent Hunter and Mejiro Steed. On 21 March at Hanshin he added another Grade II win when he defeated Mejiro Bright in the 3000 metre Hanshin Daishoten. The Grade I spring edition of the Tenno Sho over the same course and distance saw Special Week matched against eleven opponents including Mejiro Bright (winner of the race in 1998), Matikanefukukitaru, Seiun Sky, Stay Gold, Silk Justice (Arima Kinen). Special Week recorded his second Grade I win as he defeated Mejiro Bright by half a length with Seiun Sky two and a half lengths back in third. In the Takarazuka Kinen over 2200 metres at Hanshin on 11 July, his final start before the summer break, Special Week was matched against Grass Wonder a colt who had been the best of his generation in 1997 but missed most of the 1998 season before returning to win the Arima Kinen in December. Special Week was beaten three lengths into second place by Grass Wonder but finished seven lengths clear of the other ten runners.

On his return to racing in autumn, Special Week finished seventh behind Tsurumaru Tsuyoshi in the Kyoto Daishoten on 10 October. In the Tenno Sho over 2000 metres at Tokyo on 31 October, Special Week attempted to become the second horse to win both the spring and autumn editions of the race in the same year. The race attracted a seventeen-runner field including Mejiro Bright, Silent Hunter, Tsurumaru Tsuyoshi, King Halo, Seiun Sky, Stay Gold, Stinger (Hanshin Juvenile Fillies) and Air Jihad (Yasuda Kinen). In a closely contested conclusion to the race, Special Week prevailed by a neck from Stay Gold, with Air Jihad, Stinger, Seiun Sky and the outsider Embrasser Moi all finishing within two lengths for the winner. The winning time of 1:58.0 was a new record for the race.

On 28 November, in front of a crowd of 155,000, Special Week made his second attempt to defeat international competition in the Japan Cup. The Prix de l'Arc de Triomphe winner Montjeu started favourite with Special Week the joint-second choice alongside the German horse Tiger Hill, twice winner of the Grosser Preis von Baden. The other European challengers were High-Rise, Borgia and Fruits of Love (Hardwicke Stakes) whilst Hong Kong was represented by their Horse of the Year Indigenous. The best fancied of the other Japanese runners were Rascal Suzuka (third in the Kikuka Sho), Stay Gold and Umeno Fiber (Yushun Himba). Special Week was restrained by Take in the early stages before turning into the straight in sixth place. He took the lead approaching the last 200 metres and won by one and a half lengths and a nose from Indigenous and High-Rise, with Montjeu in fourth. Yutaka Take, who was winning the race for the first time said, "I am very pleased because I could achieve one of my dreams... I am proud to be Japanese."

Special Week ended his racing career when he met Grass Wonder for the second time in the Arima Kinen at Nakayma in December. The race produced a four-way photo finish in which Special Week was beaten a nose by Grass Wonder, with T M Opera O and Tsurumaru Tsuyoshi just behind.

For his efforts over the course of the season, Special Week was given a special award at the JRA Awards for 1999.

Stud record
Special Week was retired from racing to stand at the Shadai Stallion Station in Hokkaido. He later moved to the Lex Stud where he was based in 2015. He died from injuries sustained when he fell in his paddock in April 2018.

The most successful of his offspring was the mare Buena Vista who won six Grade I races including the Tenno Sho and the Japan Cup, Roman Legend (Tokyo Daishoten), Cesario (Yushun Himba, American Oaks) and Toho Jackal (Kikuka Sho).

Popular culture
Special Week was the inspiration for the main character of the 2018 anime Uma Musume Pretty Derby, which premiered shortly before his death.

Pedigree

References 

1995 racehorse births
2018 racehorse deaths
Racehorses bred in Japan
Racehorses trained in Japan
Thoroughbred family 3-l
Japan Cup winners